William Campbell (October 30, 1923 – April 28, 2011) was an American actor who appeared in supporting roles in major film productions, and also starred in several low-budget B-movies and horror films.

Career
Campbell's film career began in 1950, with a small part in the John Garfield film The Breaking Point. After several years of similar supporting performances in a number of films, including as a co-pilot in William Wellman's The High and the Mighty (1954), he won his first starring role in Cell 2455 Death Row (1955), a low-budget prison film for Columbia Pictures. He played a death row inmate, based loosely on the true story of Caryl Chessman, who staunchly proclaimed his innocence and obtained numerous reprieves over many years until finally being executed. Campbell's surprisingly powerful performance received generally good notices from critics, but it did very little for his career; his next several roles were again providing support to lead actors, including Man Without a Star (1955), Love Me Tender (1956)  in which he became the first person to lip sync portions of a song onscreen (actually recorded on August 24, 1956, by the Ken Darby Trio) with Elvis Presley, and the 1958 film version of Norman Mailer's The Naked and the Dead.  

In 1958, Campbell co-starred with Paul Birch in Cannonball, a short-lived television series about truck drivers. After that, he worked for more years in small parts in increasingly lower grade movies.

Campbell made two guest appearances on Perry Mason in 1959 and 1960. In his first appearance he played the title character and murder victim Allen Sheridan in "The Case of the Artful Dodger," then he played murderer and title character Jim Ferris in "The Case of the Ill-Fated Faker."

In 1963, Campbell began a brief association with Roger Corman, starring in the director's The Young Racers that year. The auto-racing-themed movie, written for the screen by Campbell's brother Robert Wright Campbell, was shot in Ireland. After production was completed, the film's sound man, Francis Ford Coppola, talked Corman into allowing Coppola to remain in Ireland with a small crew and direct a low-budget horror film, to be produced by Corman. Coppola promised it would be the cheapest film Corman was ever involved in. Shot for approximately $40,000, the resultant film, Dementia 13 (1963), was an atmospheric and violent horror thriller clearly made in imitation of Psycho. Campbell starred as a moody loner who at one point becomes the chief suspect in a series of gruesome axe killings; Patrick Magee and Luana Anders led the supporting cast. Many years later, Campbell would provide an audio commentary for the film's DVD release.

Campbell also starred in another Corman-produced horror yarn. Filmed in 1963 in Yugoslavia under the title Operacija Ticijan, again with Magee in the cast, the film was never released in its original form. It was re-edited, re-dubbed, and briefly shown on television as Portrait in Terror. Years later, additional footage was shot in California, first by Jack Hill, then by Stephanie Rothman, transforming what was once a spy thriller into the story of a vampire stalking the streets of Venice, California. Retitled Blood Bath, although it also became known as Track of the Vampire, the film received a limited theatrical release in 1966. Campbell also filmed The Secret Invasion in Yugoslavia that was directed by Roger Corman and written by his brother Robert Wright Campbell.  Campbell was the only one of the team of commandos not given screen credit above the title.

One year previously in 1965 he landed a supporting role as a reporter in the classic suspense horror; Hush...Hush, Sweet Charlotte. In Blood Bath Campbell's character was an artist who killed women and hid their bodies inside his sculptures; he is also a vampire who can freely walk during the daylight in search of victims. However, the fanged vampire was confusingly played by another actor who did not resemble Campbell. Like Dementia 13, the film has managed to develop a following despite its deficiencies. In the early 1990s, Video Watchdog magazine devoted lengthy articles in three separate issues painstakingly detailing the convoluted production history of this strange but fascinating movie.

Campbell had guest starring roles in the Star Trek franchise, appearing first as the mischievous super-being Trelane, in an episode of the original series called "The Squire of Gothos". Campbell also appeared twice as the Klingon Captain Koloth. Campbell first played Koloth on the original Star Trek series in the episode "The Trouble with Tribbles". He reprised the role on the series Star Trek: Deep Space Nine episode entitled "Blood Oath", some thirty years later. Campbell appeared at several Trek conventions in the 1980s and 1990s. His last appearance was at the convention organized by Creation Entertainment at the Las Vegas Hilton in August 2006.

Personal life and death
Campbell served in the U.S. Navy during World War II on a minesweeper in the Pacific theater.

Campbell was married three times. His first marriage was to Judith Exner in 1952. They divorced in 1958. His second wife was Barbara Bricker. They were married from 1960–1961. He married his third wife, Tereza, in 1963. They were married until his death.

Campbell is a relative of Jeff Janiak, vocalist of the band Discharge.

Campbell died on April 28, 2011, at the Motion Picture & Television Country House and Hospital in Woodland Hills, California.

Partial filmography

 The Breaking Point (1950) as Concho
 Breakthrough (1950) as Cpl. Danny Dominick (as Bill Campbell)
 Operation Pacific (1951) as The Talker (credited as Bill Campbell)
 Inside the Walls of Folsom Prison (1951) as Nick Ferretti
 The People Against O'Hara (1951) as Frank Korvac
 Holiday for Sinners (1952) as Danny Farber
 Battle Circus (1952) as Captain John Rustford
 Small Town Girl (1953) as Ted, News Photographer
 Code Two (1953) as Companion
 Big Leaguer (1953) as Julie Davis
 Escape from Fort Bravo (1953) as Cabot Young
 The High and the Mighty (1954) as Hobie Wheeler
 Battle Cry (1955) as Pvt. 'Ski' Wronski
 Man Without a Star (1955) as Jeff Jimson
 Cell 2455, Death Row (1955) as Whit Whittier
 Running Wild (1955) as Ralph Barton
 Backlash (1956) as Johnny Cool
 Love Me Tender (1956) as Brett Reno
 Man in the Vault (1956) as Tommy Dancer
 Eighteen and Anxious (1957) as Pete Bailey
 The Naked and the Dead (1958) as Brown
 Money, Women and Guns (1958) as Clinton Gunston
 The Sheriff of Fractured Jaw (1958) as Keeno
 Natchez Trace (1960) as Virgil Stewart
 Night of Evil (1962) as Chuck Logan
 The Young Racers (1963) as Joe Machin
 Dementia 13 (1963) as Richard Haloran
 Operacija Ticijan (1963) as Toni
 The Secret Invasion (1964) as Jean Saval
 Hush… Hush, Sweet Charlotte (1964) as Paul Marchand
 The Money Trap (1965) as Jack Archer (uncredited)
 Portrait in Terror (1965) as Tony
 Blood Bath (1966) as Antonio Sordi
 Pretty Maids All in a Row (1971) as Grady
 Black Gunn (1972) as Rico

Television (partial)
 Cannonball: 47 episodes (1958–1959) – Jerry Austin
 The Millionaire: Tom Hampton (1959) – Tom Hampton
 Perry Mason: Season 3 Episode 9 "The Case of the Artful Dodger" (1959) – Allen Sheridan
 Perry Mason: Season 4 Episode 3 "The Case of the Ill-Fated Faker" (1960) – Jim Ferris
 Philip Marlowe: "Murder in the Stars" (1960) – Rich Darwin
 Stagecoach West: "Never Walk Alone" (1961) – Cole Eldridge
 Gunsmoke: "Old Dan" (1962) – Luke Fetch
 Combat!: "Soldier of Fortune" (1965) – Pvt. Ed Wallace 
 The Wild Wild West: "The Night of the Freebooters" (1966) – Sergeant Bender
 Star Trek: "The Squire of Gothos" (1967) – Trelane
 Star Trek: "The Trouble with Tribbles" (1967) – Koloth
 Combat!: "Nightmare on the Red Ball Run" (1967) – Corporal Sloan
 It Takes a Thief: "A Spot of Trouble" (1968) – Pierre Gropius
 Bonanza: "The Late Ben Cartwright" (1968) – Wilburn White
 O'Hara, U.S. Treasury: "Operation: Big Store" (1971) – Arnie Christenson
 Adam-12 "Ambush" (1971) – Charlie Shanks
 Ironside: "Buddy, Can You Spare a Life?" (1972) – Walter Booth
 Emergency! "Fools" (1972) – Ned Tanner 
 Adam-12 "North Hollywood Division" (1974) – Joe Dugan
 The Streets of San Francisco: "Chapel of the Damned" (1974) – Cowns
 Hec Ramsey: "Scar Tissue" (1974) – Vince Alexander
 The Streets of San Francisco: "Flags of Terror" (1974) – Callendar
 Police Woman: "Ice" (1975) – Emery Kehoe
 Gunsmoke: "The Squaw" (1975) – Striker
 Shazam!: "The Contest" (1976) – Officer Ken Taylor
 The Streets of San Francisco: "Underground" (1976) – Johnny Blackwell
 The Hardy Boys/Nancy Drew Mysteries: "Will the Real Santa Claus...?" (1977) – Markham
 Quincy, M.E.: "Quincy's Wedding", Parts 1 & 2 – Doctor Sutter (1983)
 The Return of the Six Million Dollar Man and the Bionic Woman, TV movie (1987) – General Forest
 Star Trek: Deep Space Nine: "Blood Oath" (1994) – Koloth
 Kung Fu: The Legend Continues: "Chill Ride" (1996) – Wolfe

 Video games 

 Star Trek: Judgment Rites'' (1995, CD-ROM) – Trelane

References

External links
 
 
 

1923 births
2011 deaths
American male film actors
American male stage actors
American male television actors
Burials at Forest Lawn Memorial Park (Hollywood Hills)
Male actors from Newark, New Jersey
Male Western (genre) film actors
Western (genre) television actors